ICC World Cricket League Division Five is the lowest current division in the World Cricket League (WCL) system. Like all other divisions, Division Five is contested as a standalone tournament rather than as an actual league.

The inaugural Division Five tournament was held in 2008, hosted by Jersey, and featured 12 teams. For the next four tournaments (2010, 2012, 2014, and 2016), the number of teams was fixed at six. The 2017 competition involved eight teams. Because the WCL operates on a system of promotion and relegation, teams have generally only participated in one or two Division Five tournaments before being either promoted to Division Four or relegated to Division Six. Overall, 25 teams have qualified for at least one Division Five tournament. Afghanistan and Nepal have progressed from Division Five to the World Cup Qualifier, the only teams to do so from such a low starting division.

Results

Performance by team
Legend
 – Champions
 – Runners-up
 – Third place
Q – Qualified
    — Hosts

 Note: at every edition of the tournament since 2010, the teams finishing first and second have been promoted to Division Four, and the teams finishing fifth and sixth have been relegated to Division Six. In 2008, the teams finishing first and second were promoted as usual, while every team finishing below fifth was relegated to regional tournaments.

Player statistics

References

Division 5